Afrocominella capensis, common name the elongate whelk, is a species of sea snail, a marine gastropod mollusc unassigned in the superfamily Buccinoidea.

Subspecies
 Afrocominella capensis capensis (Dunker in Philippi, 1844) (synonyms: Euthria lacertina Gould, 1860; Fusus capensis Dunker in Philippi, 1844 (basionym) )
 Afrocominella capensis simoniana (Petit de la Saussaye, 1852) (synonyms: Afrocominella elongata (Dunker, 1857); Afrocominella multistriata (Turton, 1932); Cominella alfredensis Bartsch, 1915; Cominella elongata (Dunker, 1857); Euthria multistriata Turton, 1932; Euthria simoniana Petit, 1852; Fusus simonianus Petit de la Saussaye, 1852 (basionym); Glypteuthria solidissima Tomlin, 1932)

Description

Distribution
This species is found along the South Coast of South Africa

References

 Steyn, D.G. & Lussi, M. (1998) Marine Shells of South Africa. An Illustrated Collector’s Guide to Beached Shells. Ekogilde Publishers, Hartebeespoort, South Africa, ii + 264 pp. page(s): 108 
 Kilburn R.N., Marais J.P. & Fraussen K. (2010) Buccinidae. pp. 16–52, in: Marais A.P. & Seccombe A.D. (eds), Identification guide to the seashells of South Africa. Volume 1. Groenkloof: Centre for Molluscan Studies. 376 pp.

Buccinidae
Gastropods described in 1844